The eighth and final season of the American comedy television series That '70s Show premiered November 2, 2005 on Fox in the United States. The season ended on May 18, 2006, with the series finale. 

The eighth season marked a major change in the series, as the show's star Topher Grace who portrayed Eric Forman, the central character, left the series at the end of the previous season and was replaced by new character Randy Pearson (portrayed by Josh Meyers). Eric was often mentioned throughout the season, even being an important off-stage character central to an episode's plot upon occasion.  Grace returned as Eric for the final episode, although his role was brief and uncredited. 

Another major change was the departure of Michael Kelso, who was portrayed by Ashton Kutcher. Kutcher had quit the show at the end of season seven but remained on the series for five episodes during the eighth season. He appeared in the first four episodes to give closure to Kelso and he appeared again in the final episode.

Another big change to the show was the opening sequence that plays over the theme song; instead of the characters driving down a street in a car, they take turns singing lyrics of the theme song in "the circle", a camera angle used throughout the series when the group sits in a circle and gets intoxicated. 

Leo (Tommy Chong) returned as a main character, following his return to the series in the seventh season in a special guest role. 

Many plots of the season involved Donna's new relationship with Randy, Jackie falling in love with Fez, Hyde marrying a stripper named Samantha, Kelso getting a new job and moving to Chicago, and the Formans adjusting to an empty nest which is too empty for Kitty and not empty enough for Red because the other kids still were around despite Eric's absence. 

This season is set entirely in 1979, with the final seconds of the series being the final seconds of the decade. The last seconds of the series show the license plate of Eric's Vista Cruiser for the final time, now featuring a tag with the year "80" on it, signaling that the 1980s have begun.

All episodes of season 8, except the finale, are named after songs by Queen.

The region 1 DVD was released on April 1, 2008.

Cast

Main
Mila Kunis as Jackie Burkhart
Danny Masterson as Steven Hyde
Laura Prepon as Donna Pinciotti
Wilmer Valderrama as Fez
Debra Jo Rupp as Kitty Forman
Kurtwood Smith as Red Forman
Josh Meyers as Randy Pearson
Don Stark as Bob Pinciotti
Tommy Chong as Leo

Recurring
Jim Rash as Fenton
Bret Harrison as Charlie
Ashton Kutcher as Michael Kelso
Jud Tylor as Samantha
Lara Everly as Hilary
Tim Reid as William Barnett
Mary Tyler Moore as Christine St. George

Guest
Yvette Nicole Brown as Sgt. Davis
Allison Munn as Caroline
Robert Clotworthy as Customer
Sam McMurray as Larry
Carol Ann Susi as Receptionist
Topher Grace (uncredited) as Eric Forman

Special appearance
Bruce Willis as Vic
Don Knotts as The Landlord
Dick Van Patten as Murph
Gavin MacLeod as Smitty
Steve Landesberg as a friend of Red Forman
Isaac Hayes as himself
Tom Bosley as Dr. Hammond
Barry Williams as Jeff
Christopher Knight as Josh
Justin Long as Andrew

Episodes

Notes

References 

 That '70s Show Episode Guide at The New York Times

External links 
 
 

2005 American television seasons
2006 American television seasons
Television series set in 1979
8